The women's 400 metres event at the 1996 World Junior Championships in Athletics was held in Sydney, Australia, at International Athletic Centre on 21, 22 and 23 August.

Medalists

Results

Final
23 August

Semifinals
22 August

Semifinal 1

Semifinal 2

Heats
21 August

Heat 1

Heat 2

Heat 3

Heat 4

Participation
According to an unofficial count, 24 athletes from 19 countries participated in the event.

References

400 metres
400 metres at the World Athletics U20 Championships